This is a list of the minor computer underground artscene groups spanning from roughly 1992 to the present day.

1 
 123 "123 ASCII" : 2000–2004
 27 Inch : 2003–2004
 765 "The Girl Scouts" : 1996

A 
 ACE : 1993
 AiM "Art in Madness" : 1995
 ALiVE "ALiVE Productions" : 1994
 Anemia : 1995–1996
 Apocalyptic Visions : 1994–1998
 Apathy : 1995–1996
 ATOMiC : 1991–1994
 Avenge :  1998–1999
 AWE "Awe Lettering" : 1996–1999

B 
 B2B "Back to the Basix" : 1995
 BAD "Bitchin' ANSI Design" : 1993–1994
 Black Maiden : 1985–2008
 Bleach : 1995
 Blend : 1996–1997
 Blur : 1996
 Boil : 1997–1998
 BROkEN : 1995–1996

C 
 CANCER : 1994–1995
 Cenobite : ????-????
 CHAOS "Total Chaos" : 1992–1993

D 
 DiE : 1993–1994

E 
 Echo : 1997–1998
 Eclipse : 1994–1997
 EDEN : 1994–1995
 EGA : 1996
 EP "Extended Play" : 1996–1998
 Epic "Epic Arts" : 1999–2000
 ETERNiTY : 1993
 Everglo : 1997

F 
 FAT "Futuristic Artists with Talent" : 1994
 Fact! : 1996
 FORCE : 1995–1998
 FOKUS "Fokus Fonting" : 1999
 FOS "Fistful of Steel" : 1996–1997
 FUEL : 1995–1998, 2017–2019
 Function : 1998
 Fusion : 19??-19??

G 
 Galza "HRG's Ascii Art Division" : 1999–
 Glue : 1997–2001
 GRiP-AD "Graphic Revolution in Progress – Art Division" : 1993–1995
 GOTHiC : 1993
 Gravity : 1996

H 
 Hallucigenia : 1998–1999
 HoA "HighOnASCii" : 2003–2004
 HRG "Hellraiser Group" : 1996–2000

I 
 iMPERiAL : 1994
 Innate : ????
 Integrity : 1995

K 
 Karma : 1998
 KTS "Katharsis" : 1994–1995

L 
 Lapse : 1994
 Lazarus : 1996–1997, 2020-present
 Legacy : 1993
 Legend : 1995–1996
 Legion : 1998
 Leper Society : 1994–1996
 LiE "Liquid iCE Enterprises" : 1996

M 
 Maiden "Maiden Brazil" : 1996–1998
 MAD : 1994
 Mean Scheme : 1996–1997
 MiRAGE : 1992
 MiSTiGRiS : 1994-1998, 2014-present
 mOp "Monkeys on Porches" : 1995–1996

N 
 NATiON : 1994–1995
 Nerp : 1997–1998
 Nettwerk: 1994–1997
 NWA "New Wave Artists" : 1994

O 
 Ocean5 : 2010 – 
 Odelay : 1996–1998
 Odium : 1995–1996
 oOps!ascii : 19??-19??
 Ophidiac : 1996
 Opium "Opium Graphics" : 1995–1997

P 
 Pain! : 1995–1996
 Phantasm: 1995–?
 Phat: 1995–1997
 PHUX: 1997–2003
 Plain : 1996
 PLF "Poffelipoff Productions" : 1997–1999
 the Project : 1999
 PURG "Phucked Up ReneGade" : 1996–1999

R 
 RAT "Rippin' Artistic Talent" : 1990–1999
 RCA "Real Crazy Artists" : 1996–1998
 RELiC : 1992–1997
 Revival : 2002
 RIOT "Revolution In Our Time" : 1993–1994
 Riot : 1997–1998
 ROC "Rulers of Chaos" : 1994–1996

S 
 Sadist : 1996-20XX
 Saga : 1995, 1997
 Samsara : 1996
 Scrollz : ????-1999
 Se7en / Vii: 1999, 2003–2004
 Sense : 1997–1998
 Sense "Sense Imagery" : 2002–Present
 Septic : 1996
 Spastic "Spastic Studios" : 1995
 SHaRP : 1994
 SHiVER : 1994–1995
 sOap "Sons of ASCII Prophets" : 1994–1996
 STD : ca. 1995–1997
 STD "Spread The Disease" : 2003
 Stile : 1994–1995

T 

 Teklordz Productions : 1994–1997
 The 5th : 1997
 Think : 1997–1998
 TNT "The Next Testament" : 2004–2005
 Trank : 1995–1996
 TRiBE : 1993–1994
 Twilight' : 1997

U 
 UNiON : 1994–1995
 Used : 2000

V 
 VIIx2 : 2006–Present
 ViViD : 1997–1999
 VOR "Visions of Reality" : 1993

W 
 wBALLS : 1994
 WiCKED : 1995–1996
 WOE "WOE!ASCII" : 1996–1998

Z 
 Zeitnot : ????-????
 Zenith : 1998

See also 
 Computer Art Scene

External links 
 Dark Domain The ACiD Artpacks Archive on DVD, contains extensive database of artscene releases.
 artscene.textfiles.com, The artscene branch of the textfiles.com library.
 Sixteen Colors Archive, An artscene release library, with the ability to search by keywords and view ANSI artwork within the browser.